The 1868 Omata by-election was a by-election held  on 7 February in the  electorate in Taranaki during the 4th New Zealand Parliament.

The by-election was caused by the resignation of the incumbent, Arthur Atkinson in 1867.

He was replaced by Charles Brown.

Brown was the only nomination, so was declared elected unopposed.

References 

Omata 1868
1868 elections in New Zealand
February 1868 events
Politics of Taranaki